Mummy Calls is the debut album released by British band Mummy Calls, released in 1986. Two singles were issued from the album, "Let's Go" and "Beauty Has Her Way".  The latter single was used in the film The Lost Boys and also appears on that film's soundtrack.  The band split shortly after the release of their debut.

Track listing
"Kiss Me"  (Bint, Brook, Banks)
"Sexual Desire"  (Bint, Brook, Banks)
"We Will"  (Bint, Banks)
"Let's Go"  (Banks)
"Beauty Has Her Way"  (Brook, Banks)
"Deadly Night"  (Brook, Banks)
"Chestnut Tree"  (Banks)
"In the Darkness"  (Brook, Banks)
"Message on My Door"  (Banks)
"Jane I'll Kiss You in the Desert"  (Banks)

Personnel 
David Banks - vocals
Alan Bint - keyboards
Andrew Hingley - bass
Paul Howard - saxophone
Paul Brook - drums
Management: Brian Lane

Additional musicians
David Rhodes - guitar on "Kiss Me", "Sexual Desire", "We Will" and "Deadly Night"
Linda Taylor - backing vocals
Tessa Niles - backing vocals
Helena - backing vocals
Ester Benjamin - backing vocals
Kayley Stephenson - backing vocals
Billy Hamilton - backing vocals
Elisa Richards - backing vocals

Production credits 
Producer - John Luongo ("Kiss Me", "Sexual Desire", "We Will", "Let's Go" & "Deadly Night")
Producer - Hugh Padgham ("Beauty Has Her Way", "Chestnut Tree", "In the Darkness", "Message on My Door" & "Jane I'll Kiss You in the Desert")
Mixed by Julian Mendelsohn & John Luongo
Engineered by Gary Helman, Hugh Padgham & Alan Douglas
Assistant engineers: Croydon, Renny, Spike, Martin & Paul
Recorded at The Townhouse Studios & Sarm West Studios, London
DMM Direct Metal Mastering
Band technician: Richard

Additional credits
Art direction: Jeri McManus
Design: Kim Champagne
Front cover art: Lori Lobstoeter
Special thanks to Rovena Cardiel
All songs copyrighted 1986, by Chappell & Co. Ltd.

References

External links 
Mummy Calls on Facebook

Mummy Calls albums
1986 debut albums
Albums produced by Hugh Padgham